TPC Tampa Bay is an 18-hole golf course located in Lutz, Florida.

Opened in 1991, TPC Tampa Bay was designed by Bobby Weed in consultation with tour professional Chi Chi Rodriguez and is part of the Tournament Players Club network operated by the PGA Tour. In February 2008, the facility was sold to the Heritage Golf Group, but retained its TPC branding under a licensing agreement.

Golf
TPC Tampa Bay was the venue for the annual Encompass Insurance Pro-Am of Tampa Bay, an event on the Champions Tour.
TPC Tampa Bay has won numerous awards and continues to garner praise and rave reviews. 
2016 Justin Wink - West Central PGA Chapter Merchandiser of the Year - PGA of America 
2016 Justin Wink - North Florida PGA Chapter Merchandiser of the Year - PGA of America 
2014 Top 50 Public Ranges - Golf Range Magazine 
2012 100 Best Golf Shops - GolfWorld 
2011 Justin Wink - West Central PGA Chapter Merchandiser of the Year - PGA of America 
2011 100 Best Golf Shops - GolfWorld 
2009 Readers Choice Awards (#13) GolfWorld Magazine's  Readers Choice Poll

2005 - 2008 Environmental Leadership in Golf Award - Golf Digest and the GCSAA

Cuisine
In 2015, TPC Tampa Bay opened up a new modern restaurant called ¡CUATRO.  The inspiration for ¡CUATRO not only came from the word "Fore!" shouted across the TPC Tampa Bay golf course (which provides the restaurant's lush backdrop), but also from the four culinary influences Chefs Michael Toscano and Wes Morton bring from their own family tables: Mexican, Italian, Cajun and American home cooking. Chef Michael Toscano has been recognized as a James Beard "Rising Star Chef" Semi-Finalist and winner of the StarChefs.com "New York Rising Stars Award". ¡CUATRO is open to the public 7 days a week for breakfast, lunch, and dinner.

References

External links
 Official site

Golf clubs and courses in Florida
Golf clubs and courses designed by Bobby Weed
Buildings and structures in Hillsborough County, Florida
Tourist attractions in Hillsborough County, Florida
1991 establishments in Florida